The 2022–23 season is the 113th season in the history of PEC Zwolle and their first season back in the second division of Dutch football. The club are participating in the Eerste Divisie and the KNVB Cup. The season covers the period from 1 July 2022 to 30 June 2023.

Players

Transfers

Pre-season and friendlies

Competitions

Overall record

Eerste Divisie

League table

Results summary

Results by round

Matches 
The league fixtures were announced on 17 June 2022.

KNVB Cup

References 

PEC Zwolle seasons
PEC Zwolle